Austin Katz (born March 19, 1999) is an American competitive swimmer who specializes in backstroke events. He is a World University Games gold medalist and a Pan Pacs bronze medalist. At the 2020 US Olympic Trials, Katz placed third in the 200m backstroke behind Ryan Murphy and Bryce Mefford, just missing out on an Olympic berth by one place. From 2017 to 2021, Katz swam collegiately for the University of Texas at Austin where he was a three-time NCAA champion and the current American record-holder in the 4×200-yard freestyle relay.

See also
 NCAA Division I Men's Swimming and Diving Championships
 List of United States records in swimming
 Texas Longhorns swimming and diving
 Texas Longhorns

References

1999 births
Living people
People from Tarpon Springs, Florida
Sportspeople from Sarasota, Florida
American male swimmers
American male backstroke swimmers
Universiade medalists in swimming
Universiade gold medalists for the United States
Universiade silver medalists for the United States
Medalists at the 2019 Summer Universiade
Medalists at the 2017 Summer Universiade
Texas Longhorns men's swimmers
Riverview High School (Sarasota, Florida) alumni
20th-century American people
21st-century American people